The 2015–16 Colorado Buffaloes men's basketball team represented the University of Colorado in the 2015–16 NCAA Division I men's basketball season. This was Tad Boyle's sixth season as head coach at Colorado. The Buffaloes played their home games at Coors Events Center in Boulder, Colorado and were members of the Pac-12 Conference. They finished the season 22–12, 10–8 in Pac-12 play to finish in fifth place. The defeated Washington State in the first round of the Pac-12 tournament to advance to the quarterfinals where they lost to Arizona. They received an at-large bid to the NCAA tournament where they lost in the first round to UConn.

Previous season
The Buffaloes finished the season with an overall record of 16–18, and 7–11 in conference play. In the Pac-12 Tournament the Buffaloes defeated Oregon State in the First round before losing to Oregon in the quarterfinals. The team accepted an invitation to play in the CBI where they defeated Gardner–Webb in the First round, and lost to Seattle  in the Second round.

Off-season

Departures

Incoming transfers

2015 recruiting class

Roster

Schedule

|-
!colspan=12 style="background:#000000; color:#CEBE70;"| Non-conference regular season

|-
!colspan=12 style="background:#000000;"| Pac-12 regular season

|-
!colspan=12 style="background:#000000;"| Pac-12 tournament

|-
!colspan=12 style="background:#000000;"| NCAA tournament

See also
2015–16 Colorado Buffaloes women's basketball team

References

Colorado
Colorado Buffaloes men's basketball seasons
Colorado Buffaloes men's basketball
Colorado Buffaloes men's basketball
Colorado